Repatriation is the voluntary or involuntary return of travellers and migrants to their place of origin.

Repatriation may also refer to:

 Repatriation (cultural heritage), the return of artifacts to their place of origin
 Digital repatriation, return in a digital format
 Repatriation and reburial of human remains
 Repatriation (film), a 2004 South Korean documentary film
 Voluntary return
 Extraordinary repatriation, the return of persons to their country without going through the government of that country